Hugo Patt is a politician from Belize who served as Deputy Prime Minister of Belize and Acting Prime Minister of Belize from 6 July 2019 to 9 July 2019 and serving as Member of the House of Representatives from Corozal North. He also served as Minister of Natural Resources from 2018 and Minister of Local Government and Rural Development.

References 

Members of the Belize House of Representatives for Corozal North
Year of birth missing (living people)
Living people